Ictidochampsa is an extinct genus of therocephalian therapsids from the Late Permian of South Africa. The type species Ictidochampsa platyceps was named by South African paleontologist Robert Broom in 1948 from the Dicynodon Assemblage Zone.

References

Lopingian synapsids of Africa
Whaitsiids
Therocephalia genera
Lopingian genus first appearances
Lopingian genus extinctions